Crossville is a city in and the county seat of Cumberland County, Tennessee, United States. It is part of the Crossville, TN Micropolitan Statistical Area. The population was 12,071 at the 2020 census.

History
Crossville developed at the intersection of a branch of the Great Stage Road, which connected the Knoxville area with the Nashville area, and the Kentucky Stock Road, a cattle drovers' path connecting Middle Tennessee with Kentucky and later extending south to Chattanooga. These two roads are roughly paralleled by modern US-70 and US-127, respectively.

Around 1800, an early American settler named Samuel Lambeth opened a store at this junction, and the small community that developed around it became known as Lambeth's Crossroads. The store was located at what has become the modern intersection of Main Street and Stanley Street, just south of the courthouse. By the time a post office was established in the 1830s, the community had taken the name of "Crossville". In the early 1850s, James Scott, a merchant from nearby Sparta, purchased the Lambeth store and renamed it Scott's Tavern.

When Cumberland County was formed in 1856, Crossville, being nearest the center of the county, was chosen as county seat. Scott donated the initial  for the erection of a courthouse and town square.

Crossville and Cumberland County suffered rampant pillaging throughout the Civil War as the well-developed roads made the area accessible to both occupying Union and Confederate forces and bands of renegade guerrillas. With divided communities and families, there was vicious guerrilla warfare, and residents suffered as if there were major battles in the area. The county was divided throughout the conflict, sending a roughly equal number of troops to both sides.<ref name="Brookhart">G. Donald Brookhart, "Cumberland County", Tennessee Encyclopedia of Culture and History, 2009, accessed 7 November 2011</ref>

After World War I, U.S. 70 helped connect the town and area to markets for its produce and goods. Additional highways built after World War II improved transportation in the region.

During the Great Depression, the federal government's Subsistence Homestead Division initiated a housing project south of Crossville known as the Cumberland Homesteads. The project's purpose was to provide small farms for several hundred impoverished families. The project's recreational area would later become the nucleus for Cumberland Mountain State Park. In 1934, First Lady Eleanor Roosevelt visited Crossville and the Cumberland Homesteads Project.

Crossville was a sundown town as late as the 1950s, with a sign at the city limits warning African Americans not to stay after nightfall.

Geography

Crossville is located at the center of Cumberland County at  (35.954221, -85.031267). The city is situated atop the Cumberland Plateau amidst the headwaters of the Obed River, which slices a gorge north of Crossville en route to its confluence with the Emory River to the northeast. Crossville is roughly halfway between the plateau's eastern escarpment along Walden Ridge and its western escarpment along the Highland Rim. Several small lakes are located on the outskirts of Crossville, including Lake Tansi to the south, Lake Holiday to the west, and Byrd Lake at nearby Cumberland Mountain State Park.

Crossville developed at the intersection of two major stage roads by which settlers moved through the area. The roads were gradually widened, improved and turned into paved roads. Two major federal highways: U.S. Route 70, which traverses Tennessee from east to west, and U.S. Route 127, which traverses Tennessee from north to south, now roughly follow the old routes. Interstate 40, which runs roughly parallel to U.S. 70, passes through the northern part of Crossville.

Climate
Crossville has a humid subtropical climate (Köppen Cfa), with warm summers and cool winters. Temperatures in Crossville are moderated by the city's high elevation and the Cumberland Plateau.

Demographics

2020 census

As of the 2020 United States census, there were 12,071 people, 5,040 households, and 2,777 families residing in the city.

2000 census
As of the census of 2000, there were 8,981 people, 3,795 households, and 2,440 families residing in the city. The population density was 609.2 people per square mile (235.2/km2). There were 4,268 housing units at an average density of 289.5 per square mile (111.8/km2). The racial makeup of the city was 97.12% White, 0.04% African American, 0.23% Native American, 0.35% Asian, 0.04% Pacific Islander, 1.04% from other races, and 1.18% from two or more races. Hispanic or Latino people of any race were 2.43% of the population.

There were 3,795 households, out of which 27.4% had children under the age of 18 living with them, 45.2% were married couples living together, 15.5% had a female householder with no husband present, and 35.7% were non-families. 31.3% of all households were made up of individuals, and 13.1% had someone living alone who was 65 years of age or older. The average household size was 2.25 and the average family size was 2.79.

In the city, the population was spread out, with 22.6% under the age of 18, 9.3% from 18 to 24, 26.5% from 25 to 44, 21.8% from 45 to 64, and 19.9% who were 65 years of age or older. The median age was 38 years. For every 100 females, there were 85.0 males. For every 100 females age 18 and over, there were 81.5 males.

The median income for a household in the city was $25,796, and the median income for a family was $33,207. Males had a median income of $26,735 versus $20,217 for females. The per capita income for the city was $18,066. About 21.7% of families and 24.6% of the population were below the poverty line, including 36.2% of those under age 18 and 20.6% of those age 65 or over.

Recent population estimates show the population of Crossville around 11,498 in 2008.

Points of interest

 Cumberland Mountain State Park is located immediately south of Crossville.
 The Cumberland Homesteads are also located south of Crossville.
 The Native Stone Museum, located in a 1930s-era Tennessee Highway Patrol station on the courthouse square, is dedicated to Crab Orchard Stone, a local building material used in many of the city's buildings.
 The Palace Theatre, which opened in 1938, still serves as a theater, performance venue, and meeting hall.
 The United States Chess Federation moved its corporate offices to Crossville from New Windsor, New York, in 2005.  US Chess announced in 2022 that it is leaving Crossville for St. Louis.
 The Highway 127 Corridor Sale, promoted as the world's largest yard sale, is held annually in August.
 The Cumberland County Playhouse is the only major non-profit professional performing arts resource in rural Tennessee, and one of the 10 largest professional theaters in rural America. It serves more than 165,000 visitors annually with two indoor and two outdoor stages, young audience productions, a comprehensive dance program, a concert series and touring shows.
 Crossville bills itself as "the golf capital of Tennessee" and features 12 courses: Stonehenge, Heatherhurst Crag, Heatherhurst Brae, Deer Creek, River Run, Four Seasons, The Bear Trace, Dorchester, Mountain Ridge, Renegade, Druid Hills, and Lake Tansi.
 The Cosby Harrison Company (formerly known as TAP Publishing) was created in 1937 by Cosby Harrison with the first publication, Trade-A-Plane, which is still being published today. Over the years TAP Publishing has created and published other products that can be found nationwide and even internationally, such as; Rock & Dirt, Rock & Dirt en Espanol, Tradequip, weatherTAP, and NextTruck Online.
 The Cumberland County Fair is held every August.
 Art Circle Public Library
 Horace Burgess's Treehouse is a treehouse and church, closed in 2012.
 A free-speech zone on the Cumberland County Courthouse lawn was the site of several unofficial displays, including a statue of the Flying Spaghetti Monster, an Iraq and Afghanistan Soldier's Memorial, a miniature Statue of Liberty, chainsaw carvings of a nativity scene, Jesus carrying the cross, and monkeys and bears. As of April 30, 2008, the lawn is no longer a free-speech zone due largely to the controversy caused by the Flying Spaghetti Monster statue.

Notable people

 Mandy Barnett, country music singer and actress born in Crossville
 Billy Wayne Davis, stand-up comedian
 Julie Ann Emery, actress born and raised here
 Stormi Henley, Miss Tennessee Teen USA 2009, Miss Teen USA 2009
 Milo Lemert, posthumous Medal of Honor recipient for action near Bellicourt, France, during World War I and buried in Crossville City Cemetery
 Earl Lloyd, first African-American to play in an NBA basketball game
 Thomas Shadden, politician, former member of the Tennessee General Assembly and former Crossville mayor
 Michael Sims, acclaimed nonfiction writer
 Charles Edward Snodgrass, U.S. Congressman
 Michael Turner, comic book artist, born in Crossville; former president of the entertainment company Aspen MLT
 Marjorie Weaver, film actress

Further readingCrossville, Tennessee Pictorial History''. Nashville: Turner Publishing Company (2001).

References

External links

 City of Crossville official website
 Crossville-Cumberland County Chamber of Commerce
 Cumberland County Playhouse
 Speak Up Crossville  
 Crossville News First  
 Municipal Technical Advisory Service entry for Crossville — information on local government, elections, and link to charter

Cities in Tennessee
Cities in Cumberland County, Tennessee
County seats in Tennessee
1856 establishments in Tennessee
Sundown towns in Tennessee